The 2009–10 or XVIII Ukrainian Hockey Championship was the 18th annual edition of the Ukrainian Hockey Championship, and final season for the Ukrainian Major League. It took place from October 18, 2009, April 9, 2010. 6 teams participated in Division A, three teams in Division B, and six teams in Division C. HC Sokil Kyiv won the championship.

First round

Division A - Central

Division B - Southern

Division C - Western

Playoffs

Qualification
 Dnipro Kherson - Vorony Sumy 2:14/1:6
 Vatra Ivano-Frankivsk - HC Donbass 4:3 OT/1:4/0:5 Forfeit

Quarterfinals 
 Vorony Sumy - HC Sokil Kyiv 0:5/1:15
 HC Donbass - Bilyi Bars Brovary 0:4/2:6

Semifinals 
 Bilyi Bars Brovary - HC Berkut-Kyiv 1:3/0:7
 HC Sokil Kyiv - HC Kharkiv 4:1/3:2

3rd place 
 Bilyi Bars Brovary - HC Kharkiv 2:3 OT/3:6

Final 
 HC Sokil Kyiv - HC Berkut-Kyiv 5:2/3:2 OT

References

External links
Official FHU season documentation
Season standings
Season standings
Ukrainian Ice Hockey Federation

Ukraine
Ukrainian Hockey Championship seasons
Ukr